Whitby is a seaside town, fishing port and tourist destination in North Yorkshire on the north-east coast of England.

Whitby may also refer to:

Places
Whitby, Cheshire, suburb of Ellesmere Port, England
Whitby, New Zealand, suburb of Porirua
Whitby, Ontario, city in Canada
Whitby (electoral district), one of the 338 ridings in the house of commons
Whitby GO Station, transit station in Whitby, Ontario
Whitby, West Virginia, American coal mining village
Whitby, Western Australia, suburb of Perth
Whitby Abbey, Benedictine abbey ruin in Whitby, Yorkshire
The Whitby, apartment building in New York City

Sports
Whitby Dunlops, name of several Canadian hockey clubs
Whitby Fury, Canadian hockey club
Whitby Lawmen, Canadian hockey club
Whitby Town F.C., English football club
Whitby Warriors, Canadian box lacrosse team

People
Ælfflæd of Whitby (654–713), English Christian saint
Alfred Knight Whitby (c. 1844–1898), lawyer in Adelaide, South Australia
Beatrice Whitby (1855–1931), English novelist
Daniel Whitby (1638–1726), English theologian
Elizabeth Whitby (c. 1803–1888), founder and principal of school for girls in Adelaide, South Australia
Francis John Whitby (c. 1840–1909), station manager for J. H. Angas in South Australia
Greg Whitby (born 1952), Australian educator
Hilda of Whitby (c. 614–680), English Christian saint
Joseph James Whitby (1838–1875), lawyer in Adelaide, South Australia
Joy Whitby (born 1930), English television producer and executive 
Mike Whitby (fl. since 1979), English politician
Tim Whitby (fl. since 1992), British television writer/director
William Whitby (died 1655), Virginia colonial politician
Whitby Hertford (born 1978), American voice actor

Fictional characters
Kevin Whitby, in the Harry Potter novels

Other uses
 Whitby-class frigate, class of six Royal Navy ships
 HMS Whitby, the name of two ships of the Royal Navy
 HMCS Whitby, the name of a Royal Canadian Navy frigate
 Bishop of Whitby, Church of England clerical office
 Synod of Whitby (664), Christian church conference in England
 Whitby (barque), was one of the first New Zealand Company ships bringing settlers and supplies Nelson, New Zealand

See also
Prospect of Whitby, a London pub
The Whitby Witches, fantasy novel series by Robin Jarvis
Whidbey (disambiguation)